Dona Ganguly ( Roy) (born 22 August 1977) is an Indian Odissi dancer. She took her dancing lessons from guru  Kelucharan Mohapatra. She has a dance troupe Diksha Manjari. In 1997 she eloped with and married her childhood friend and later Indian cricketer and skipper Sourav Ganguly, 35th president of Board of Control for Cricket in India. The couple has a daughter Sana (born 2001).

Personal life 
Dona Ganguly was born on 22 August 1977 in an affluent business family in Behala, Kolkata. Her parents were Sanjeev Roy (father) and Swapna Roy (mother). She was a student of Loreto Convent School.

She eloped with her childhood friend Sourav Ganguly because their families were sworn enemies at that time. Later their families accepted the marriage and a formal wedding took place in February 1997. The couple have a daughter Sana Ganguly.

On 5 October 2022, she was infected with mosquito-borne disease Chikungunya and was admitted to Woodlands Hospital, Kolkata.

Dancing career 
Dona Ganguly started learning dance from Amala Shankar when she was only 3 years old. Later she shifted to Odissi under the guidance of Guru Giridhari Nayek. Dona considers the most significant development took place when she met Kelucharan Mohapatra and started taking dancing lessons from him. At early stage of her career, in different programs, Mohapatra accompanied her many times with Pakhavaj.

Performances 
 Dover Lane Music Conference, Kolkata
 Konarak Festival, Konarak
 River Festival, Kolkata
 Uday Shankar Dance Festival, Kolkata
 Barak Utsov, Silchar, Assam
 Dakshin Mukambi National Festival, Kottyam, Kerala
 Baba Alauddin Khan Sangeet Samaraho (Maihar), M.P.
 Bali Yatra Cuttack
 Kumar Utsov, Bhubaneswar
 Bharat Bhavan, Bhopal
 Haridas Samaraho, Brindavhan
 Samudra Maha Utsov, Puri
 Beach Festival, Digha
 Haldia Utsov, Haldia
 Sankat Mochan Festival Varanasi
 Ganga Maha Utsov, Varanasi
 Antiquity Festival, Kolkata
 Muktashwar Festival, Bhubaneswar
 Mirtunjay Utsov, Varanasi
 Bhojpur Festival, Bhopal
 Kalidas Samoraho, Ujjain
 Taj Mohotsav, Agra
 World Expo, China, 2010
 Chaitrakut Mohotsav, Chitrakut
 Narmada Mohotsav, Jabalpur

Diksha Manjari 
Dona Ganguly has a dance school named Diksha Manjari. This institution was inaugurated by Lata Mangeshkar. It has capacity of more than 2000 students. Other than dancing, this institution has other departments like Yoga, Drawing, Karate and Swimming.

In October 2012, Dona Ganguly choreographed Rabindranath Tagore's Shapmochan which she called a sombre dance drama.

References

External links 
 

Artists from Kolkata
Odissi exponents
Living people
1977 births
Bengali women artists
Indian female classical dancers
Performers of Indian classical dance
Dancers from West Bengal
20th-century Indian women artists
20th-century Indian dancers
Women artists from West Bengal